Per-Arne Andersson (born 15 July 1958) is a Swedish water polo player. He competed in the men's tournament at the 1980 Summer Olympics.

References

External links

1958 births
Living people
Swedish male water polo players
Olympic water polo players of Sweden
Water polo players at the 1980 Summer Olympics
Sportspeople from Västerås